Exploring is an interactive, worksite-based career education program of Learning for Life, an affiliate of the Boy Scouts of America. Participants in the program are called Explorers. The program serves youth in 6th-8th grades (Exploring clubs), and young men and women who are 14 through 20 years old (Exploring posts). Exploring units (clubs or posts), are sponsored by local businesses, government agencies, and nonprofit organizations, and usually focus on a single career field, but can also introduce youth to a variety of career fields within a single unit.

Prior to 1998, the Exploring program was the main BSA program for older youth and participants were called Explorer Scouts. The program included both career focused posts, and posts with an emphasis on outdoor activities. The outdoor posts became the BSA's Venturing program.

History
The Exploring program has a long history within the BSA. The program got its start in the 1930s as the "Senior Scout" program for boys 15 and older. The Senior Scout program included the Sea Scouts, Air Scouts, Explorer Scouts, Rover Scouts and a few others. Explorer Scouts focused on advanced camping and worked on advancement leading to the Ranger Award. Sea Scouts and Air Scouts were nautical and aviation focused programs, respectively.

In 1949, the Senior Scout program became the Explorer Program. Sea Scouts became Sea Explorers, Air Scouts became Air Explorers, and Explorer Scouts became just Explorers. The Explorer program became less of an advanced outdoor program, and more a broader program for older youth. They got a new advancement program leading to the Silver Award. Also, the minimum age was lowered to 14.

In 1959, the Explorer Program became the Exploring program. Explorer advancement was dropped. In 1964, the Air Explorer program was eliminated, and the Sea Explorer program had changes made. The program was further changed to be more appealing to older youth, with career exploration becoming a bigger part of the program.

In 1969/71, the BSA allowed Girl Scouts of the USA and Camp Fire Girls to join Exploring, then made the Explorer program fully co-ed, and raised the upper age to 21. After this time, Exploring started to focus more and more on career exploration, though outdoor oriented Posts still existed.

In 1998, the Exploring program was split. All the career-oriented posts were moved to Learning for Life, while the rest became the new Venturing (Boy Scouts of America) program. Exploring is now a worksite-based career education program for young men and women 14 through 20 years old.

Current programs
There are many different programs with Exploring.
 Arts and Humanities Career Exploring Field
 Aviation Field / General Interest / Career Exploring
 Business / Small or Large Exploring Field
 Communications Career Field Exploring
 Engineering & Technology Career Field 
 Fire & Emergency Service Exploring Field
 Healthcare Career Field
 Law, Government, & Public Service Field 
 Law Enforcement Exploring
 Science Career Exploring Fields
 Skilled Trades Career Exploring Field
 Social Services Career Exploring
 Hobbies Exploring

Further reading

References

External links

Boy Scouts of America
Learning programs
American military youth groups